Emmett is a given name, also used as a surname. It may be connected to the given name Emma, or the place of Emmott, Lancashire (now known as Laneshawbridge, but still containing Emmott Hall), or it is connected to the Hebrew word  (emét), "Truth". It could, however, also come from the old English word for an ant, as still used in Cornwall.

People with this name include:

Surname
 Arthur Emmett (judge), judge and lecturer in Roman law
 Chris Emmett, British actor
 Dan Emmett, American composer
 Dan W. Emmett, Californian politician
 Edward Nucella Emmett 19th-century Australian entrepreneur
 Evelyn Temple Emmett, Tasmanian
 Henry James Emmett 19th-century Tasmanian public servant
 Herbert Emmett, English footballer
 Josh Emmett, American mixed martial artist
 M. L. Emmett, poet
 Rik Emmett, musician, founding member of the Canadian rock band Triumph
 Robert Emmet, Irish Revolutionary
 Rowland Emett, English sculptor and cartoonist.
 Sean Emmett, British Grand Prix motorcycle road racer
 Tom Emmett, English cricket player

Given name
Emmett Barrett, American football player
Emmett Dalton, member of the Dalton Gang
William Emmett Forrest Jr, American pop culture collector
Emmett J. Hull (1882–1957), American architect
Emmett Kelly (1898–1979), American circus performer, who created the clown figure "Weary Willie"
Emmett Leith, American scientist and electrical engineer
Emmett McLoughlin, ex-priest, author of People's Padre, and housing activist in Phoenix, Arizona
Emmett Morrison (1915–1993), American basketball player
Emmett J. Scanlan, Irish actor who plays Brendan Brady in Channel 4 soap opera Hollyoaks
Emmett Skilton, New Zealand actor
Emmett Till, African-American youth whose lynching was a key event leading up to the American Civil Rights Movement

Fictional
Emmett, a mailbox from the TV show The Adventures of Timmy the Tooth
Emmett Bledsoe, a character from Switched at Birth (TV series)
Dr. Emmett Brown, a character in the Back to the Future franchise
Emmett Cullen, a character from the Twilight series
Emmett Graves, a protagonist from Starhawk (2012 video game)
Emmett Honeycutt, a character in Queer as Folk (US version)
Emmett Richmond, a character from the film Legally Blonde
Emmett Forrest, a character from the play Legally Blonde (musical)
Emmett Yawners, a Deputy for the Banshee County Sheriff's Department from Banshee (TV series)
Emmett Clayton, a Chess Grandmaster and Murderer  in Columbo, season 2, episode 7 - The Most Dangerous Match

See also
 Emmitt, given name and surname

References

English masculine given names